Benjamin Henry Latrobe II (December 19, 1806 – October 19, 1878) was an American civil engineer, best known for his railway bridges, and a railway executive.

Personal life
Born in Philadelphia, Pennsylvania on December 19, 1806, he was the youngest son of Benjamin Henry Latrobe who six years previously had married his second wife, Mary Elizabeth Hazlehurst (1771–1841) of Philadelphia. Three years earlier, President Thomas Jefferson hired his father as Surveyor of Public Buildings in the new national capitol, Washington, D.C. His father became best known as the second Architect of the Capitol, because he redesigned the rebuilt United States Capitol after the British Army burned Washington in August 1814 during the War of 1812. The senior Latrobe also designed and supervised construction of the first Roman Catholic cathedral built in the United States, the old Baltimore Cathedral (later named the Basilica of the Assumption of Mary), 1806–1821, as well as construction of the Chesapeake & Delaware Canal. He and his eldest son Henry Sellon Boneval Latrobe (1792–1817) died of yellow fever while working in New Orleans, Louisiana. His elder full brother John Hazlehurst Boneval Latrobe became a lawyer, painter and inventor of the Baltimore heater (an improvement upon the Franklin stove).

The younger Benjamin H. Latrobe studied in Baltimore, Maryland, and later at Georgetown College in Georgetown, just west of the new Federal City, in the District of Columbia.

He married Maria Eleanor "Ellen" Hazlehurst (1806–1872) of Altoona, Pennsylvania on March 12, 1833. They had four sons (two of whom survived childhood) and three daughters. Their eldest son, Charles Hazelhurst Latrobe (1833–1902), moved to Florida where he married and later joined the Confederate States Army. A civil engineer like his father and grandfather, Charles H. Latrobe later moved back to Baltimore where he served as the city's chief engineer for 25 years and continued to design public buildings and bridges noted for their beauty. His brother, Benjamin Henry Latrobe, III (1840–1901) became an Episcopal Church priest and rector of the Church of Our Savior in Silver Spring, Maryland.

Career
Around 1820, Latrobe worked with his father to establish a water supply for New Orleans, Louisiana, moving back north after his father's unexpected death of typhoid and to work with his brother John as a lawyer in Baltimore.

The Baltimore and Ohio Railroad (B&O) hired this Latrobe to work on a surveyor crew in the summer of 1830. In 1832, as assistant engineer, Latrobe surveyed and planned the route for the Washington Branch. For this route between Baltimore and Washington, D.C., he designed the Thomas Viaduct, which became the largest bridge in the United States when completed in 1835. The viaduct spans the Patapsco River between Relay and Elkridge, Maryland. As the project engineer, Latrobe worked closely with the railroad's construction chief, Caspar Wever. Nicknamed "Latrobe's Folly" by those who doubted the massive structure could support itself, the bridge remains in use today (as of 2019), carrying far heavier loads than ever envisioned.

In 1835, Latrobe became the chief engineer for the Baltimore and Port Deposit Railroad Company, which helped build the first rail link between Philadelphia and Baltimore.

Latrobe returned to the B&O in 1836. Along with Louis Wernwag, he designed the railroad's first bridge across the Potomac River at Harper's Ferry, West Virginia, which opened in 1837. In 1842, the B&O appointed him as Chief Engineer, succeeding his boss, Jonathan Knight. He served in the position for 22 years. He was appointed to the concurrent position of general superintendent of the B&O in 1847. He later became president of the Pittsburgh and Connellsville Railroad, part of the B&O's Pittsburgh District.

In the 1860s, Latrobe became a consulting engineer for the Troy and Greenfield Railroad, and worked on construction of the Hoosac Tunnel in Massachusetts, then the second-longest tunnel in the world.

Death and legacy
Benjamin H. Latrobe II died in Baltimore, on October 19, 1878, and was buried in Green Mount Cemetery, whose landscape architecture he had designed, beside his wife. His brother John H. B. Latrobe was on the cemetery's board of directors as well as helped found the Maryland Historical Society, which maintains the family papers.

References

External links
Family tree in Genealogisches Handbuch der baltischen Ritterschaften, Estland,  Görlitz 1930 

1806 births
1878 deaths
19th-century American railroad executives
19th-century American engineers
Georgetown University alumni
Businesspeople from Baltimore
Businesspeople from Philadelphia
American railway civil engineers
Baltimore and Ohio Railroad people
American railroad pioneers
Burials in Louisiana
Latrobe, Pennsylvania
Engineers from Pennsylvania
Latrobe family